The Hungarian placename Fehérvár ("white castle") may refer to:
 Székesfehérvár, city located in central Hungary,
 Dnyeszterfehérvár, city and port of Bilhorod-Dnistrovskyi in Odessa Oblast, Ukraine 
 Gyulafehérvár, city located in Transylvania, Romania
 Nándorfehérvár, the old Hungarian name of Belgrade, Serbia
 Tengerfehérvár, city and municipality of Biograd na Moru in northern Dalmatia, Croatia 
 Videoton FC Fehérvár, football club from Székesfehérvár, Hungary